Louis Victor Armbruster (born 12 July 1902 – 11 October 1984) was an Australian rugby league footballer for New South Wales, Queensland and Australia. He is considered one of the nation's finest footballers of the 20th century.

Armbruster was born in the small farming community of Meerschaum Vale, New South Wales near Lismore. He began his rugby league career in 1922, he played over 230 games, including eight for Australia, scoring 63 tries and won a premiership in his career.

Playing career
Armbruster's grade career commenced in the country at Mullumbimby, New South Wales from where he gained state selection for New South Wales in 1922. He played in the historic match of 1922 which saw Queensland beat New South Wales for the first time since 1908. Many of the victorious Queenslanders that day would later be Armbruster's state and national team-mates.

Along with his future Kangaroo captain Tom Gorman and state/national teammate Herb Steinohrt, Armbruster was a member of the 1924-25 world class Toowoomba side that beat all-comers including Sydney premiers Souths, Brisbane, Ipswich and representative sides including New South Wales, Victoria, Great Britain and New Zealand.

While playing with Toowoomba, Armbruster first gained national selection appearing in the 2nd and 3rd Tests of the 1924 domestic Ashes series against Great Britain.

He played with the Grammars club in Brisbane and then Valleys and was a regular representative in the Queensland state side making 35 appearances up till 1931. He was selected for the 1929–30 Kangaroo tour of Great Britain and played in three Tests and sixteen minor representative tour games.

In February 2008, Armbruster was named in the list of Australia's 100 Greatest Players (1908–2007) which was commissioned by the  NRL and  ARL to celebrate the code's centenary year in Australia.

In 2008, rugby league in Australia's centenary year, Armbruster was named on the bench of both the Bundaberg Rugby League's and Toowoomba and South West teams of the century. He was also inducted in the National Rugby League Hall of Fame.

References

External links
Queensland Representatives, qrl.com.au; accessed 12 July 2017.

1902 births
1984 deaths
Australia national rugby league team players
Australian rugby league players
Fortitude Valley Diehards players
Norths Devils players
Other Nationalities rugby league team players
Rochdale Hornets players
Rugby league second-rows
Rugby league players from Lismore, New South Wales